During the 1976–77 English football season, Arsenal F.C. competed in the Football League First Division.

Season summary
In the 1976–77 season, former Tottenham boss Terry Neill was recruited by the Arsenal board to replace Bertie Mee in the summer, and at the age of 34 he became the youngest Arsenal manager to date.

Arsenal started the season well with just 2 defeats in their first 9 league games but their title challenge soon began to fade and at one stage went on a poor run of 9 defeats in 11 league games picking up just 3 points out of the possible 22. The Gunners finished the season in a disappointing 8th place.

Final league table

Results
Arsenal's score comes first

Legend

Football League First Division

FA Cup

League Cup

Squad

References

Arsenal F.C. seasons
Arsenal